Musapsocidae is a family of Psocodea (formerly Psocoptera) belonging to the suborder Troctomorpha. The pterostigma in their fore-wing has the characteristic of not being closed proximally. The family comprises 2 genera.

Sources 

 Lienhard, C. & Smithers, C. N. 2002. Psocoptera (Insecta): World Catalogue and Bibliography. Instrumenta Biodiversitatis, vol. 5. Muséum d'histoire naturelle, Genève.

Psocoptera families
Troctomorpha